Baron Klas Kristersson Horn (1517 – September 9, 1566) was a Finnish born, Swedish nobleman and Naval Admiral who fought for Sweden in the Northern Seven Years' War of 1563–1570.

Biography
Horn was born at Åminne Manor in Halikko, Finland. He was the son of Krister Klasson Horn  and Ingeborg Siggesdtr Sparre.  He received his early education in the court of Philip I, Duke of Pomerania. In 1550, King Gustav I of Sweden made him the head of the district of southern Finland at Raseborg.

He participated in the expeditions  of Jakob Bagge during the fall of 1555. 
In 1556,  he was sent to Viborg Castle and the following year was made commander.
In 1559, he won a number of battles against Danish naval forces under Herluf Trolle and the Free City of Lübeck.
Horn was sent to Reval (now Tallinn) by King Eric XIV of Sweden in March 1561. By June, Toompea Castle was conquered by his troops and Reval became a dominion of Sweden.

Klas Horn was raised to nobility (Horn af Åminne) and made a Baron in June 1561. 
After Jakob Bagge was captured, Klas was promoted to Admiral in the Royal Swedish Navy in the fall of 1564. In January 1565, forces under his command sacked the Danish provinces of Scania and Halland. He won a decisive victories over the Danish navy at Bornholm on July 7, 1565 and on July 26, 1566 in the third battle of the northern part of Öland.
He died shortly after being called to command Swedish land forces.

Personal life
In 1551, he married  Kerstin Krumme (1532–1611). He died at Stora Åby parish in Östergötland, Sweden and was buried at Uppsala Cathedral.

Legacy
Baron Klas Kristersson Horn has been recognized as a naval hero with both the Royal Swedish Navy and Finnish Navy naming vessels in his honor;  HSwMS Klas Horn (1929) and Klas Horn (1892).

See also
Battle of Rügen (1565)
Horn family
Klas-class destroyer
Finnish gunboat Klas Horn

References

Related reading
Björn Wahlroos (2009) Åminne - gårdens historia och restaureringen av karaktärsbyggnaden	(Helsingfors: Lönnberg) 

1517 births
1566 deaths
People from Salo, Finland
Swedish admirals
Swedish civil servants
Barons of Sweden
Swedish-speaking Finns
16th-century Finnish people
16th-century Swedish military personnel
People of the Northern Seven Years' War
Burials at Uppsala Cathedral